Hans Wallmark (born 23 January 1965), is a Swedish politician of the Moderate Party. He has been a member of the Riksdag since 2006. He served as President of the Nordic Council in 2014 and in 2019.

References

External links 

1965 births
Living people
Members of the Riksdag 2006–2010
Members of the Riksdag 2010–2014
Members of the Riksdag 2014–2018
Members of the Riksdag 2018–2022
Members of the Riksdag 2022–2026
21st-century Swedish politicians
Members of the Riksdag from the Moderate Party